Ganga Dynasty is a name used for two related dynasties who ruled parts of India:
 The Western Ganga Dynasty, a kingdom in southern India, based in southern Karnataka, from the 3rd to the 11th centuries
 The Eastern Ganga Dynasty, rulers of Odisha from the 11th to the 15th centuries